Daniel K. Tarullo (born November 1952) is an American law professor who served as a member of the Federal Reserve Board of Governors from 2009 to 2017.  Tarullo concurrently served as the chairman of the Federal Financial Institutions Examination Council (FFIEC). In February 2017, he announced his intention to resign from the Board of Governors in early April 2017.

He also taught at Harvard Law School, specialized in international economic regulation, banking law, and administrative law.

Early life
Tarullo was born in Boston, Massachusetts, and graduated from the prestigious Roxbury Latin School in 1969. He received a B.A. from Georgetown University in 1973 and an M.A. at Duke University in 1974. He graduated summa cum laude in 1977 from the University of Michigan Law School.

Career
Tarullo worked in the Antitrust Division of the U.S. Department of Justice and as Special Assistant to the Undersecretary of Commerce. He taught at Harvard Law School early in his career and later served as Chief Counsel for Employment Policy on the staff of Senator Edward M. Kennedy and practiced law in Washington, D.C.

He served in the Clinton Administration as Deputy Assistant to the President for Economic Policy and later as Assistant to the President for International Economic Policy where he was responsible for coordinating the international economic policy of the administration. He was a member of the National Economic Council and the National Security Council. He was also Assistant Secretary of State for Economic and Business Affairs from 1993 to 1996.

Tarullo served as a senior fellow at the Council on Foreign Relations and as a senior fellow at the Center for American Progress. During 2005 he was the chair the Economic Security group of the Princeton Project on National Security.

Shortly after he took office, President Barack Obama nominated Tarullo to the Board of Governors of the Federal Reserve. He took office on January 28, 2009, to fill an unexpired term ending January 31, 2022.

On January 3, 2014, Daniel Tarullo administered the oath of office to Janet Yellen, as Chairman of the Federal Reserve, as she took office, replacing Ben Bernanke, who joined the Brookings Institution, as a distinguished fellow in residence.

Articles and editorial work

Editorial
Runs the bi-monthly World Economic Update, a forum sponsored by the Council on Foreign Relations for debate on the United States and global economies among leading economists.
Serves on the editorial advisory board of The International Economy and the Advisory Committee of Transparency International.

Articles
"Reforming the World Bank and IMF", August 2, 2007
"Laboring for Trade Deals: Trade Agreements and Labor Rights", March 28, 2007
"The Case for Reviving the Doha Trade Round", January 8, 2007

References

External links
Statements and Speeches of Daniel K. Tarullo

1952 births
American people of Italian descent
Businesspeople from Boston
Clinton administration personnel
Duke University alumni
Federal Reserve System governors
Georgetown University alumni
Harvard Law School faculty
Living people
Roxbury Latin School alumni
United States Assistant Secretaries of State
University of Michigan Law School alumni
Obama administration personnel
Trump administration personnel